The Danish Civil Aviation and Railway Authority is the Danish government agency responsible for regulating, planning and safety relating to public transport in Denmark. 
The agency also acts as an advisor towards the ministry related to policy and strategic development in transport. 
It further acts as the administrator of the government's procurement of ferry and rail transport through public service obligations  and collects and publishes statistics related to public transport.

The agency was reorganised on 14 April 2010. It was from 2010 to 2021 a part of the larger Danish Transport, Construction and Housing Authority.

By royal resolution on 23 January 2021, the Ministry of the Interior and Housing was established, and the authority's areas of responsibility for housing and construction were transferred to the newly established Danish Housing and Planning Authority and the authority's name was changed to Danish Civil Aviation and Railway Authority.

Overview
The headquarters are in Copenhagen, Denmark. In 2010, annual revenue was +1.4 billion DKK ($235 million USD) and employees approximately 250 people.

Objective
The role of the Danish Transport Authority includes the following functions:
 The Danish Government's railway authority, responsible for regulation, planning, safety and transport co-ordination nationally and internationally. 
 Civil Aviation Authority (CAA) in Denmark, Greenland and the Faroe Isles. 
 Regulation, approval and oversight regarding market access for railway, aviation and postal services. 
 International relations regarding transport markets including representation in forums within the European Union, intergovernmental organizations and the coordination of EU-matters and –hearings. 
 Adviser to the Ministry of Transport on matters relating to transport policy and the strategic development of the transport sector.    
 Licensing and transport-related training of personnel in the areas of railway, and aviation.  
 Collection of data and publishing statistical information regarding railway safety, punctuality, etc.

References

External links

 Official site

Rail transport in Denmark
Government agencies of Denmark
Government agencies established in 2003
Public transport in Denmark